Bilge Karasu (born 9 January 1930 – 13 July 1995), was a Turkish short story writer and novelist.

Biography 
Bilge Karasu was born in 1930 in Istanbul.<ref>[http://www.gazetekadikoy.com.tr/edebiyat-hayatimizdan-hatirlamalar/bilge-karasu-yagmurlu-kentin-gunescisi-h16038.html Bilge Karasu Yagmurlu Kentin Gunescisi] ; Katikoy Gazette; accessed</ref>  Bilge Karasu's parents, who later converted to Islam, were of Jewish origin, although he does not have any kinship with Emanuel Karasu, an Ottoman politician of Jewish origin.  He studied at Şişli Terakki High School and at Istanbul University, Faculty of  Literature, Department of Philosophy.  In 1963, he returned from Europe, where he had studied on a Rockefeller scholarship.  In 1964, he started to work as a translator at the General Directorate of Press, Broadcasting, and Tourism and in the foreign broadcasting service of Ankara Radio.

Karasu wrote radio plays for Ankara Radioı.  He worked as a lecturer at Hacettepe University's Philosophy Department from 1974 until his death. 

He lived in a small basement on Nilgün Street in Ankara for years.  He died on 14 July 1995 at Hacettepe University Hospital, Ankara where he was being treated for pancreatic cancer.  He is buried in Karşıyaka Cemetery.

 Bibliography 

 Stories 
 Troya’da Ölüm Vardı (1963)
 Uzun Sürmüş Bir Günün Akşamı (1970)
 Göçmüş Kediler Bahçesi (1980)
 Kısmet Büfesi (1982)
 Lağımlaranası ya da Beyoğlu Susanlar (2008) (öykü, şiir, deneme, röportaj)

 Novels 
 Gece (1985)
 Kılavuz (1990)

 Essays 
 Ne Kitapsız Ne Kedisiz (1994)
 Narla İncire Gazel (1995)
 Altı Ay Bir Güz (1996) (ölümünden sonra yayınlandı)

 Radio plays 
 Peter Pan (Radyo için oyunlaştıran Bilge Karasu) (1967), Ankara Radyosu
 Sevilmek, (Ocak 1970), Ankara Radyosu
 Kerem ile Kediler, (Mart 1970), Ankara Radyosu
 Gidememek Aşk Translations 
 Abraham Lincoln, Emil Ludwing, 1953, Cep Kitapları
 Doktor Martino, William Faulkner, 1956, Yenilik Publications
 Bella'nın Ölümü, Georges Simenon, 1981, Karacan Publications
 Salgına İnanıyorum, Jean Cocteau, 1968, Türk Dili (Sinema Ozel Sayısı), Ankara: Volume: 196 (January 1968), p. 422-425
 İşin Özü Bir Öykü Anlatmaktır, Jean Renoir, Türk Dili (Sinema Ozel Sayısı), Ankara: Volume: 196 (January 1968), p. 426-428

 Awards 
 1963 Turkish Language Association Translation Award, The Dead Man, translated from D. H. Lawrence

 Books written about 
 Bilge Karasu Aramızda (1997) (Prepared by: Füsun Akatlı, Müge Gürsoy Sökmen)
 Yazının da Yırtılıverdiği Yer (Bir Bilge Karasu Okuması) (2007); Author: Cem İleri; Metis Publications
 Bilge Karasu'yu Okumak (Prepared by: Doğan Yaşat), Metis Publications, 2013.
 Excavating Memory: Bilge Karasu’s Istanbul and Walter Benjamin’s Berlin'' (2020); Author: Ülker Gökberk; Academic Studies Press

See also 
 MEB 100 Türk edebiyatçısı listesi

References

Notes 

1930 births
1995 deaths
Writers from Istanbul
Turkish philosophers
Turkish erotic artists
Istanbul University alumni